Nikolai Petrovich Gorbunov (21 June 1892 – 7 September 1938) was a Soviet politician, chemist, engineer and  academic; at one time personal secretary to leader Vladimir Lenin.

Biography 
Born in Krasnoye Selo, in Saint Petersburg, his parents were Pyotr Mikhailovich Gorbunov and Sofia Vasilievna Gorbunova. Pyotr was an honoured citizen who worked as an engineer and later as a director of a paper factory not far from Saint Petersburg. Sofia Vasilievna descended from the Pechatkin family and was a joint owner of the factory, of which her husband was a director. Both Gorbunov's parents owned a number of middle-sized houses. Pyotr Mikhailovich was a liberal who founded a school for the children of workers at his factory. His brother was the naturalist Grigoriy Petrovich Gorbunov. Gorbunov graduated from the Petrograd Institute of Technology and received a diploma in chemistry and technology. From his student years he was a convicted ed Marxist and actively participated in the February Revolution.

Gorbunov joined the Russian Social Democratic Labour (b) in July 1917 and quickly started to work in the apparatus of the Soviet government with the recommendation of Vladimir Bonch-Bruevich.   

Gorbunov was secretary of the Council of People's Commissars of the USSR and wrote of the period immediately following the Bolshevik seizure of power:

On 17 July 1918, Gorbunov received a coded telegram from Alexander Beloborodov, the Chairman of the Presidium of the Ural Regional Soviet, regarding the shooting of the former Tsar Nicholas II and his family, with instructions to pass on the message to Yakov Sverdlov without delay. Sverdlov announced the tsar's death to the All-Russian Congress of Soviets the following day.

He served in his role as Administrator of Affairs of the Council of People's Commissars  until 1930, continuing to serve under the Premierships of Alexei Rykov and Vyacheslav Molotov after the death of Lenin. 

From 1923 to 1929 he was rector of the Bauman Moscow State Technical University. From 1935 he was a full member and In 1937 he was secretary of the Academy of Sciences of the Soviet Union.

During the Great Purge, Gorbunov was indicted for espionage, sentenced to death and executed in 1938. 

He was rehabilitated in 1954.

References

External links
 Gorbunov, Nikolai Petrovich in The Great Soviet Encyclopedia (1979)

1892 births
1938 deaths
People from Krasnoye Selo
Soviet politicians
Old Bolsheviks
Great Purge victims from Russia
People executed by the Soviet Union by firearm
Bauman Moscow State Technical University
Full Members of the USSR Academy of Sciences
Soviet engineers
Soviet chemists
Soviet rehabilitations